Yolande Speedy (born December 30, 1976 in Johannesburg) is a South African professional mountain biker. She has claimed two gold medals in the women's elite cross-country race at the African Mountain Bike Championships (2007 and 2013), and also represented her nation South Africa at the 2008 Summer Olympics. In 2007 Speedy competed in the Absa Cape Epic Mixed Category with team mate Paul Cordes, winning the category. She claimed 1st place again in 2013, this time in the Women's Category with team mate Catherine Williamson.

Speedy qualified for the South African squad, as a lone female rider, in the women's cross-country race at the 2008 Summer Olympics in Beijing by finishing first and receiving an automatic berth from the UCI African Championships and by recording dominant triumphs in the final stage of the Mazda MTN National Cross-Country Series in Nelspruit. With only two laps left to complete the race, Speedy suffered from a heat-related fatigue, and instead decided to pull off directly from the course, finishing only in twenty-second place.

References

External links
NBC 2008 Olympics profile

1976 births
Living people
South African female cyclists
Cross-country mountain bikers
Cyclists at the 2008 Summer Olympics
Olympic cyclists of South Africa
Cyclists from Johannesburg